is a Japanese instructor of Shotokan karate.
He has won the JKA's version of the world championships for kata on four occasions. He has also won the JKA All-Japan championships for kata on six occasions and for kumite on two occasions.

Biography

Yoshiharu Osaka was born in Fukuoka Prefecture, Japan on 8 September 1947. He studied at Takushoku University. His karate training began during his first year of high school.

Competition
Yoshiharu Osaka has had considerable success in karate competition.

Major tournament successes
26th JKA All Japan Karate Championship (1983)  - 1st Place Kata
4th IAKF World Karate Championship (Egypt, 1983)  - 1st Place Kata
25th JKA All Japan Karate Championship (1982)  - 1st Place Kata
24th JKA All Japan Karate Championship (1981)  - 1st Place Kata
3rd IAKF World Karate Championship (Bremen, 1980)  - 1st Place Kata
23rd JKA All Japan Karate Championship (1980)  - 1st Place Kata
22nd JKA All Japan Karate Championship (1979)  - Tournament Grand Champion; 1st Place Kata; 3rd Place Kumite
21st JKA All Japan Karate Championship (1978)  - Tournament Grand Champion; 1st Place Kata; 3rd Place Kumite
2nd IAKF World Karate Championship (Tokyo, 1977)  - 1st Place Kata
19th JKA All Japan Karate Championship (1976)  - 1st Place Kumite
1st IAKF World Karate Championship (Los Angeles, 1975) - 1st Place Kata
18th JKA All Japan Karate Championship (1975)  - 2nd Place Kata; 3rd Place Kumite
17th JKA All Japan Karate Championship (1974)  - 2nd Place Kata
16th JKA All Japan Karate Championship (1973)  - 2nd Place Kata
15th JKA All Japan Karate Championship (1972)  - 2nd Place Kumite
13th All Japan Student Karate Championship (1969)  - 1st Place Kumite

References

 

1947 births
Japanese male karateka
Karate coaches
Shotokan practitioners
Sportspeople from Fukuoka Prefecture
Takushoku University alumni
Living people